The Jammu and Kashmir Legislative Assembly also known as the Jammu and Kashmir Vidhan Sabha is the legislature of Indian union territory of Jammu and Kashmir.

The Legislative Assembly of Jammu and Kashmir was dissolved by the Governor on 21 November 2018.

Prior to 2019, the State of Jammu and Kashmir had a bicameral legislature with a legislative assembly (lower house) and a legislative council (upper house). The Jammu and Kashmir Reorganisation Act, passed by the Parliament of India in August 2019, replaced this with a unicameral legislature while also re-organising the state into a union territory.

History

Praja Sabha
The first legislature of the princely state of Jammu and Kashmir, called the Praja Sabha, was established by the government of the Maharaja Hari Singh in 1934. It had 33 elected seats, 30 nominated members and 12 ex-officio members.

The first election in 1934 saw the Liberal Group headed by Pandit Ram Chander Dubey emerge as the largest party and the Muslim Conference as the second largest (with 14 seats). Further elections were held in 1938 and 1947.

In 1939, the Muslim Conference party renamed itself to National Conference under the leadership of Sheikh Abdullah and opened its membership to people of all religions. It launched a Quit Kashmir movement in 1946 and boycotted the 1947 election.

Post-accession

After the accession of the princely state of Jammu and Kashmir to the Union of India in 1947, the Maharaja ceded powers to a popular government headed by Sheikh Abdullah. Elections for a constituent assembly were held in 1951, in which Abdullah's National Conference won all 75 seats.

In 1957, a new constitution was adopted by the constituent assembly, which established a bicameral legislature consisting of an upper house, the Jammu and Kashmir Legislative Council and a lower house, the Jammu and Kashmir Legislative Assembly.

Revocation of Article 370 and reorganisation of state 
In 2019, Article 370 of the Constitution of India, which gave special status to Jammu and Kashmir, was abrogated and Jammu and Kashmir Reorganisation Act was passed to reconstitute the state of Jammu and Kashmir into union territories of Jammu and Kashmir and Ladakh with effect from 31 October 2019. The union territory of Jammu and Kashmir has a unicameral Legislative Assembly. The Jammu and Kashmir Legislative Council was formally abolished on 16 October 2019.

In March 2019, a three-member Delimitation Commission was formed, chaired by retired Justice Ranjana Prakash Desai, for the delimitation of the union territory of Jammu and Kashmir. The commission published its interim report in February 2022. The final delimitation report was released on 5 May 2022 and it came into force from 20 May 2022.

Composition
The Legislative Assembly was initially composed of 100 members, later increased to 111 by the then Constitution of Jammu and Kashmir (Twentieth Amendment) Act of 1988. Of these, 24 seats were designated for the territorial constituencies of the state that came under Pakistani control in 1947. These seats remained officially vacant as per section 48 of the then state constitution and now also in The Constitution of India. These seats were not taken into account for reckoning the total membership of the assembly, especially for deciding quorum and voting majorities for legislation and government formation. Hence the total contestable and filled seats of the assembly were 87 seats. The Kashmir valley region had 46 seats, the Jammu region had 37 seats, and Ladakh region had 4 seats.

Jammu and Kashmir Reorganisation Act was passed to reconstitute the state of Jammu and Kashmir into union territories of Jammu and Kashmir and Ladakh. In March 2020, Delimitation Commission was formed for the delimitation of the union territory of Jammu and Kashmir prior to the next Jammu and Kashmir Legislative Assembly election. The delimitation report added additional 6 seats to the Jammu division and 1 seat to Kashmir division. After delimitation, the total seats in the assembly rose to 114 seats, out of which 24 seats are designated for areas that fall under Pakistan Administered Kashmir. Out of the remaining 90 seats, 43 seats are in Jammu division and 47 seats are in the Kashmir division.

Tenure and functions
Members of the Legislative Assembly were elected for a six-year term up to 2019 and five-year term thereafter. The seats are filled by direct election from single member constituencies using the first past the post method. The assembly may be dissolved before the completion of the full term by the Lieutenant Governor upon the advice of the Chief Minister. The Lieutenant Governor may also convene special sessions of the legislative assembly.

Membership by party
The assembly is currently dissolved.

Office bearers

Source:
Speaker: Vacant
Chief Minister: Vacant
Leader of Opposition : Vacant
Secretary: Manoj Kumar Pandit

Members of Legislative Assembly 
The assembly is currently dissolved.

Attack on the State Assembly Complex
On 1 October 2001, armed terrorists belonging to Pakistan-based Jaish-e-Mohammed terrorist group carried out an attack on the Jammu and Kashmir State Legislative Assembly Complex in Srinagar using a car bomb and three suicide bombers.

See also
 Elections in Jammu and Kashmir
 List of constituencies of the Jammu and Kashmir Legislative Assembly
 List of chief ministers of Jammu and Kashmir
 List of deputy chief ministers of Jammu and Kashmir

References

External links
 Jammu and Kashmir Assembly elections 2014, mapsofindia.com

 
Politics of Jammu and Kashmir